Cain's Offering is a Finnish power metal supergroup that formed in 2008.

History
Cain's Offering was formed by former Sonata Arctica members Jani Liimatainen and Mikko Härkin, Stratovarius singer Timo Kotipelto, Norther and Wintersun bass player Jukka Koskinen and drummer Jani Hurula. Their debut album Gather the Faithful was released in July 2009 through the Japanese label Marquee Inc.. All music and lyrics were written by Liimatainen. On June 25 the band announced that they have signed a deal with Frontiers Records and that their debut album will be released on August 28 in Europe and on September 11 in the USA.

Many fans were asking about a tour, and this is what Jani said in an interview with "Power of Metal":

In June 2014, a new official Facebook page was created for Cain's Offering, and Jani mentioned that he plans to have a new Cain's Offering album written by September - according to him, he has four songs almost finished, and four more that he composed with Kotipelto. At least two of them would be used in a future album by Cain's Offering or Stratovarius.

On 5 March 2015, the title and tracklist of their second album was announced on the band's official Facebook page. The album is called Stormcrow. The album was  released on 15 May 2015 in Europe and on 19 May 2015 in North America. In Japan, the album was planned to be released on 29 April 2015.
On 15 April, one month before the European release, the band released a lyric video of the first single called "I Will Build You a Rome". 
The band surprised fans again on 22 April 2015 by releasing yet another song from the forthcoming album. This time it was the title track "Stormcrow". Both songs are available for download on iTunes. The band also announced their first ever live performances at a mini-tour of two dates in Japan in 2016.

Band members

Current members
 Timo Kotipelto – lead vocals (2009-present)
 Jani Liimatainen – guitar, backing vocals (2009-present)
 Jani Hurula – drums (2009-present)
 Jonas Kuhlberg – bass (2014-present)
 Jens Johansson – keyboards, piano (2014-present)

Former members
 Jukka Koskinen – bass (2009-2014)
 Mikko Härkin – keyboards, piano (2009-2014)

Timeline

Discography
Gather the Faithful (2009)
Stormcrow (2015)

Music Video
I Will Build You a Rome (Lyric Video) (2015)
The Best of Times (2016)

References

External links
Official website
Official Cain's Offering Facebook
Official Cain's Offering MySpace

Musical groups established in 2009
Finnish power metal musical groups
Heavy metal supergroups